Framura is a railway station in the Italian town of Framura, in the Province of La Spezia, Liguria. The station lies on the Pisa–La Spezia–Genoa railway. The train services are operated by Trenitalia.

Train services
The station is served by the following service(s):

Regional services (Treno regionale) Ventimiglia - Savona - Genoa - Sestri Levante - La Spezia - San Stefano di Magra
Regional services (Treno regionale) Novi Ligure - Genoa - Sestri Levante - La Spezia - San Stefano di Magra
Regional services (Treno regionale) Milan - Genoa - Sestri Levante - La Spezia
Regional services (Treno regionale) Turin - Alessandria - Genoa - Sestri Levante - La Spezia

See also
Railway stations in Italy
List of railway stations in Liguria
Rail transport in Italy
History of rail transport in Italy

External links

This article is based upon a translation of the Italian language version as at May 2014.

Railway stations in Liguria
Railway stations opened in 1874